Al-Hawija Sport Club, is an Iraqi football team based in Hawija District, Kirkuk, that plays in the Iraq Division One.

After ISIS era
After the end of the era of ISIS control over Hawija, and the return of life to its people, the sports activity of the club returned, after its closure, and a new football team was formed, which participated in the 2020–21 Iraq FA Cup, and also participated in the league qualifiers for the 2020–21 Iraq Division One.

Rivalries
The Al-Hawija SC–Daquq SC rivalry is a rivalry between Kirkuk-based association football clubs Al-Hawija and Daquq. Both clubs are currently playing in the Iraq Division Two.

Managerial history
 Ali Hantash
 Adel Khudhair

See also 
 2020–21 Iraq FA Cup

References

External links
 Iraq Clubs- Foundation Dates

Football clubs in Kirkuk